The Australian Cities Suite is an album by Australian recording artist Judith Durham with Orchestra Victoria. The album is a collection of songs she wrote about each capital city in Australia and was released in October 2008.

The album was re-released on 27 April 2012 and peaked at number 81 on the ARIA Chart in May 2012.

Background and release
In 2006, the Seekers were given the "Key to the City" of Melbourne. where Durham sang her song "Seldom Melbourne Leaves My Mind" as part of her speech in tribute to her home town. Durham accepted an invitation by Orchestra Victoria to record an album that would be titled The Australian Cities Suite with all royalties benefiting 400 charities.
The album was released in October 2008.

Track listing
 "Judith Durham's Advance Australia Fair - Opening Chorus" - 1:21
 "Overture" - 3:41
 "Australia Land Of Today" - 3:01
 "Seldom Melbourne Leaves My Mind" - 3:49
 "Meet Me in the Mall in Brisbane" - 2:15
 "Australia's Canberra" - 3:20
 "Happy Years I Spent in Hobart" - 3:14
 "Darwin is Da Winner" - 2:40
 "Adelaide You're Beautiful" - 3:30
 "When Perth is on the East Side" - 2:07
 "Sydney, Girl of My Dreams" - 3:01
 "Our Town" - 2:37
 "Advance Australia Fair"  2012 re-release only -  3:30
 "Australia Land of Today" - 1:45

Charts

Weekly charts

Year-end charts

Release history

References

Judith Durham albums
2008 albums
Decca Records albums
Universal Music Australia albums